The Manhattan Chamber Orchestra is a chamber orchestra based in Manhattan, New York City, New York, United States.

History 
The orchestra was founded in 1987 by Richard Auldon Clark, who remains the Artistic Director and conductor. The orchestra performs music of all genres with a special focus on contemporary music by American composers. It performs an average of eight concerts per season in New York City and also tours.

Activities 
It has premiered and/or recorded the music of William Grant Still, Alec Wilder, Victor Herbert, John Rutter, Henry Cowell, Alan Hovhaness, Otto Luening, Dominick Argento, Randall Thompson, Eric Ewazen, David Amram, and Dave Soldier. 

The Manhattan Chamber Orchestra has released 30 CDs on the Newport Classic, KOCH International, AVANT, VOX, Helicon, KLEOS Classics, and Mulatta Records labels.  It records an average of three new CDs per year.

References

External links

Manhattan Chamber Orchestra official site

Musical groups established in 1987
Chamber orchestras
1987 establishments in New York City
Orchestras based in New York City